Mninwa Johannes Mahlangu (born 8 October 1952) is a South African politician and diplomat. He was active in the Bantustan politics of Apartheid-era South Africa, serving as a parliamentarian in the former Lebowa homeland. He is currently a member of the African National Congress, and served as the Chairperson of the National Council of Provinces from 2004 to 2014, and a member of the Pan-African Parliament.

Since February 23, 2015 he is the South African Ambassador to the United States.

References

External links
 Parliament of South Africa profile - M. J. Mahlangu

Authority control

Members of the Pan-African Parliament from South Africa
Living people
African National Congress politicians
Chairpersons of the National Council of Provinces
Ambassadors of South Africa to the United States
1952 births